Rafah Camp is one of eight Palestinian refugee camps in the Gaza Strip. It is located in the Rafah Governorate along the Gaza–Egypt border. It was established in 1949 and currently forms part of the city of Rafah. During the period of its establishment, it was the largest refugee camp in the Gaza Strip; however its population has decreased due to migration to the Tall as-Sultan camp, an extension of Rafah camp, which was set up to absorb refugees repatriated from Canada Camp.

According to the UNRWA, the camp has a population of 99,000 inhabitants, This figure includes (in contrast to PCBS census data) Tall as-Sultan. The Palestinian Central Bureau of Statistics 2006 mid-year estimate for Rafah Camp alone is 59,983, for Tall as-Sultan 24,418. The camp is the second largest refugee camp in Palestine. There are 31 schools (20 primary, 11 secondary) run by the UNRWA.

References

External links
Rafah Camp articles from UNWRA
 Welcome To Rafah R.C.

Populated places established in 1949
Palestinian refugee camps in the Gaza Strip
Rafah Governorate